"Leave Me Alone with the Blues" is a song by Hank Williams.  The singer recorded it in Shreveport 1949 as a demo or as part of a radio show at KWKH studio and it was released as a posthumous single by MGM Records in 1957. It was composed by Joe Pope and was one of many covers Williams sang on the show.

Discography

References

Hank Williams songs
1957 singles
MGM Records singles